"War Pigs" is an anti-war protest song by English heavy metal band Black Sabbath, released in 1970. It is the opening track from the band's second studio album Paranoid (1970).

Overview
The original title of "War Pigs" was "Walpurgis", dealing with the witches' sabbath. "Walpurgis is sort of like Christmas for Satanists. And to me, war was the big Satan", said bassist and lyricist Geezer Butler. "It wasn't about politics or government or anything. It was Evil itself. So I was saying 'generals gathered in the masses / just like witches at black masses' to make an analogy. But when we brought it to the record company, they thought 'Walpurgis' sounded too Satanic. And that's when we turned it into 'War Pigs'. But we didn't change the lyrics, because they were already finished."

During this time period, mandatory army service had recently ended in Britain but with the Vietnam War raging, many young men feared they'd be conscripted to fight in it. "That's what started this whole rebellion thing about not going to war for anybody", said Butler. "I was dreading being called up", the lyricist recalled.

Prior to its official release, the band often altered the lyrics significantly when performing it live. An example of this can be found on Ozzy Osbourne's compilation The Ozzman Cometh, which features an early version recorded by Black Sabbath for BBC Radio 1 on 26 April 1970. While Butler has said that "War Pigs" is "totally against the Vietnam War, about how these rich politicians and rich people start all the wars for their benefit and get all the poor people to die for them", vocalist Osbourne has stated that the group "knew nothing about Vietnam. It's just an anti-war song." The song's instrumental outro is entitled "Luke's Wall" on US releases of the album, formatted as "War Pigs/Luke's Wall".

Drummer Bill Ward's first memory of performing the song was at The Beat Club in Switzerland in 1968. The band was required to play multiple sets every night and had little material in their repertoire at that point, so they would perform lengthy jam sessions to fill in the sets. Co-writer and lead guitarist Tony Iommi has said that "War Pigs" originated from one of those jam sessions.

The addition of the air-raid siren and the speeding up of the song's end were done by producer Rodger Bain and engineer Tom Allom. The band had no input in these decisions, though they were pleased with the results.

Legacy

Music journalist Martin Popoff has called the song an "ugly, antiwar classic now considered one of Sabbath's top two or three most enduring compositions". Guitar World described the song as "the greatest HM song ever." The magazine also included the song on their list of the "100 Greatest Guitar Solos" and ranked it in 56th place. Steve Huey of AllMusic called the song a "standard".

Kelefa Sanneh wrote, "What is memorable is the way Osbourne evokes not merely war's cost but its seductive appeal. Part of what made Black Sabbath seem new was a disinclination to uplifting, or hopeful, or self-righteous."

"War Pigs" is widely considered one of Black Sabbath's greatest songs. In 2020, Kerrang ranked the song number four on their list of the 20 greatest Black Sabbath songs, and in 2021, Louder Sound ranked the song number one on their list of the 40 greatest Black Sabbath songs.

The song is notable for its publication in the American folk music magazine Broadside, which normally did not feature rock songs. 
 
The song's iconic guitar riff largely inspired that of Arctic Monkeys' 2014 single "Arabella", to the extent that the band often perform an interlude of the song, to enable front man Alex Turner to pick up his guitar in time for his solo.

War Pigs was one of the 40 songs featured in the Music Monday series of the Newseum, and thus part of the Reporting Vietnam exhibit as a major musical reflection of the time.

WWE has used the song for their NXT TakeOver: WarGames events as well as their Survivor Series WarGames event.

Personnel
 Ozzy Osbourne – vocals
 Tony Iommi – guitar
 Geezer Butler – bass
 Bill Ward – drums

Certifications

See also
List of anti-war songs

References

External links
 Lyrics on Musixmatch

1970 singles
1970 songs
Anti-war songs
Black Sabbath songs
Faith No More songs
Songs of the Vietnam War
Songs written by Ozzy Osbourne
Songs written by Tony Iommi
Songs written by Geezer Butler
Songs written by Bill Ward (musician)
Vertigo Records singles